DZMQ (576 AM) Radyo Pilipinas is a radio station owned and operated by the Philippine Broadcasting Service. The station's studio and transmitter are located in Brgy. Bonuan Binloc, Dagupan. It is the pioneer AM radio station in the province.

References

Radio stations in Dagupan
Radio stations established in 1962
News and talk radio stations in the Philippines